Shahenshah (translation Emperor) is a 1953 Indian Bollywood action costume drama film directed by Amiya Chakrabarty and produced by G. P. Sippy, which was India's first full length Gevacolor film and India's third full length color film. The film was made at a budget of Rs. 3 million and was made in 14 months.

Plot

The movie is the story of Prince Rashid of Tehran who loses his father and his crown title in an invasion. The loyal Vazir (king's minister) of Tehran helps the Queen Mother, Prince Rashid and the Princess Abassa to flee to neighbouring Baghdad. Upon an old  Magician's advice the family hides their identity and lives in obscurity as Baghdad is under the control of an evil Vazir who is in charge of the baby princess Noor. Twelve years roll by and Prince Rashid grows up as a swashbuckling handsome young man who is popular with the poor and is popularly known as Shahenshah, meanwhile Princess Noor turns sixteen and Tehran is ruled by the invaders son, and in a thrilling climax, Prince Rashid wins back Tehran and frees Baghdad from the evil Vazir.

Cast  
Kamini Kaushal plays the role of Princess Noor and Ranjan plays the tailor-made role of the avenging  prince.

Ranjan as Prince Rashid
Kamini Kaushal as Princess Noor
Shakila as Princess Naseem
K. N. Singh as Vazir
Agha as Bakhtiyar

Soundtrack
The  soundtrack was composed by S.D.Burman and lyrics for all the songs were by Sahir Ludhianvi

References

External links

1953 films
1950s Hindi-language films
Films scored by S. D. Burman
Films directed by Amiya Chakravarty
Indian drama films
1953 drama films
Indian black-and-white films